Eukaryotic translation initiation factor 4E type 2 is a protein that in humans is encoded by the EIF4E2 gene. It belongs to the eukaryotic translation initiation factor 4E family.

Interactions 

EIF4E2 has been shown to interact with ARIH1.

References

Further reading

External links